al-H̨āyir, Al Ha'ir, Ha'ir or Hayer ( or )  is a small town in Riyadh Province, Saudi Arabia. As of the 2004 census it had a population of 13,473 people. The Ha'ir dam serves the area, and it also contains Ha'ir prison.

See also 

 List of cities and towns in Saudi Arabia
 Regions of Saudi Arabia

References

Populated places in Riyadh Province